James Stark  may refer to:

People
James Stark, pseudonym for Robert Conroy Goldston (born 1927), American historical writer
James Stark (painter) (1794–1859), English landscape painter
James Stark (footballer) (born 1880), Scottish footballer
James Stark (actor) (born 1819), Canadian-born American actor
James Stark (statistician) FRSE (1811–1890) first Superintendent of Statistics in Scotland
James H. Stark (1847–1919), British-American author
James P. Stark (1885–1929), British athlete
James R. Stark (born 1943), United States Navy admiral

Fictional characters
James Stark, a vampire in the House of Night series of novels

See also
Jim Stark (disambiguation)
James Starks, American football player